High as Hope is the fourth studio album by English indie rock band Florence and the Machine. It was released on 29 June 2018, by Republic and Virgin EMI Records. It was preceded by the singles "Sky Full of Song" and "Hunger". "Patricia" was released as the third and final single on 10 August 2018.

The album was executively produced by Florence Welch herself, along with Emile Haynie. Following How Big, How Blue, How Beautiful (2015), High as Hope features more minimalist, stripped-down productions and explores themes of heartache, loss, family, and finding comfort in loneliness. The album received positive reviews upon release, with music critics lauding Welch's vocal delivery and personal lyricism.

Background and recording
On 18 April 2017, Nathan Willett, the frontman of Cold War Kids hinted in an interview, that the band's fourth album is in the works by expressing that he had collaborated with Welch. The news was confirmed by Welch herself on 27 May 2017, in an interview for The Daily Telegraph. On 28 February 2018, the band's drummer, Christopher Hayden announced via Instagram that he had parted ways with the band. In March 2018, the Dutch Record Store Day website revealed that a new single by the band would be released on 12 April 2018, titled "Sky Full of Song". The listing was later removed. The single was released on 12 April 2018. The song is accompanied by a video, which was directed by AG Rojas. On 6 April 2018, the BBC announced that the band would headline the BBC Music Biggest Weekend on 26 May 2018, where the band is expected to debut new work. The band was set to perform worldwide as well, with shows scheduled throughout 2018.

Talking about the title and the themes explored on the album in an interview with Universal Music, Florence Welch said: "There is loneliness in this record, and there's issues, and pain, and things that I struggled with, but the overriding feeling is that I have hope about them, and that's what kinda brought me to this title; I was gonna call it The End of Love, which I actually saw as a positive thing cause  it was the end of a needy kind of love, it was the end of a love that comes from a place of lack, it's about a love that's bigger and broader, that takes so much explaining. It could sound a bit negative but I didn't really think of it that way." Welch is a credited producer for the first time in her discography, as she decided to take charge in making the music, with six months alone spent on demos.

Welch's lyrics deal with wanting and love, with her describing “Big God” as “obviously, an unfillable hole in the soul, but mainly about someone not replying to my text.” Intimate subjects are discussed, such as "Hunger" referencing an eating disorder in the singer's teenage years, and "The End of Love" addressing her grandmother's suicide, a topic she has previously explored on the Ceremonials track "Only If for a Night". Welch also created "Patricia" in dedication to her idol Patti Smith.

The album title is taken from a poem Welch wrote after wandering through New York City with a friend: “Heady with pagan worship/of water towers/fire escapes, ever reaching/high as hope.”

Critical reception

High as Hope received positive reviews from music critics upon release, with critics praising Welch's vocals, her themes, and the minimalist production. At Metacritic, which assigns a normalized rating out of 100 to reviews from mainstream publications, the album received an average score of 75, based on 29 reviews, indicating "generally favorable reviews". Writing for The Daily Telegraph, Neil McCormick gave the album a perfect score, stating that "Welch's singing throughout is extraordinary, shifting gears effortlessly from melancholic softness to high-powered exultation, even ululation. Every gasp, growl and fluttery trill seems perfectly placed." Roisin O'Connor of The Independent awarded the record a rating of four stars out of five, praising several songs, saying "'Grace' is a moving love letter to her younger sister which asks for forgiveness for her past, chaotic behaviour" and "stirring violins open 'The End of Love' like a sinister eulogy; Welch's voice comes in with gorgeously textured harmonies, unfolding elegantly as she details a finished relationship with bittersweet recollections."

AllMusic critic Neil Z. Yeung wrote, "Straightforward and relatably human, High as Hope may not be the rousing version of Welch from previous albums, but as a document of her personal growth, it's an endearing and heartfelt study of truth and self-reflection." Sputnikmusic gave the album a perfect score, writing, "The easiest and most likely path to continued success for Welch and company would have been to attempt to re-create the spellbinding magic of Ceremonials or the anthemic qualities of Lungs. High as Hope is neither, and that makes it hands down the most forward-thinking album of Florence and the Machine's care."

In a less enthusiastic review, NME gave High as Hope a rating of three stars out of five and called the album "safe", stating "Stripped to the bare bones of her soul and the sentiment, her truth shines – and there's a beauty in that. The only thing holding it back is a lack of risk, but there's still so much comfort in the familiar." Similarly, Slant Magazine reviewer Josh Goller also gave the album three stars out of five, and said "Welch widens the song's ['Hunger's] scope from a specific personal battle with an eating disorder to a broader emphasis on universal craving for love and acceptance, but trite statements about the destructive nature of fame and drugs are emblematic of the album's overall tendency to retreat into sweeping, generalized sentiments. Welch strikes a more effective balance between the personal and the universal on 'Big God'."

Commercial performance
High as Hope debuted at number two on the UK Albums Chart, selling 40,304 copies in its first week. In the United States, the album debuted at number two on the Billboard 200 with 84,000 album-equivalent units, including 74,000 pure album sales, becoming Florence and the Machine's third US top 10 album. The album was kept out of the top spot in both countries by Drake's Scorpion. High as Hope has sold 80,700 in the UK as of September 19, 2018.

Track listing

Notes
  signifies a co-producer.
  signifies an additional producer.
 "Big God" contains sampled elements from "Azure Blue" by Simon Benson and Peter Cox.

Personnel

Musicians
 Florence Welch – vocals, drums , percussion , piano , additional synths , additional drums 
 Emile Haynie – synths , drums , additional synths , additional drums 
 Brett Shaw – Rhodes , synths , programming , bass , additional synths , additional drums , additional percussion , Co Production 
 Thomas Bartlett – piano , Mellotron , organ , synths , bass , keyboards , additional synths , additional piano 
 Andrew Wyatt – bass , piano , Mellotron , additional synths 
 Jonathan Wilson – guitars , additional drums , additional guitar 
 Rob Ackroyd – guitars , ukulele 
 Greg Leisz – pedal steel guitar 
 Carla Azar – drums 
 Tom Monger – harp 
 Kamasi Washington – tenor saxophone ; horns arrangement 
 Jamie xx – drums , synths 
 James Gadson – additional drums 
 Jasper Randall – vocal contracting 
 Angela Parrish – backing vocals 
 Leslie Stevens – backing vocals 
 Sampha Sisay – piano 
 Tobias Jesso Jr. – additional keyboards , piano 
 Josh Tillman – additional guitar 
 Nathan Willett – backing vocals 
 Lu Lu McJunkins – cello 

Technical
 Emile Haynie – recording, additional recording 
 Brett Shaw – recording 
 Tim Montague – additional recording 
 Morgan Stratton – additional recording 
 Michael Harris – additional recording 
 Keith Gretlein – additional recording 
 Zachary Zajdel – assistant engineering 
 Christopher Cerullo – assistant engineering 
 Derrick Stockwell – assistant engineering 
 Matt Mysko – assistant engineering 
 Tom Elmhirst – mixing
 John Davis – mastering 
 Bob Ludwig – mastering 

Orchestra
 Sally Herbert – arrangement and conducting
 Tom Bailey – recording
 John Prestage – assistant engineering
 Olli Cunningham – score supervision
 Isobel Griffiths – contracting
 Amy Stewart – assistant contracting
 Everton Nelson – leading

Artwork
 Brian Roettinger – art direction
 Tom Beard – photography
 Florence Welch – drawing

Charts

Weekly charts

Year-end charts

Certifications and sales

Notes

References

2018 albums
Florence and the Machine albums
Albums produced by Emile Haynie
Republic Records albums
Virgin EMI Records albums
Albums recorded at Electro-Vox Recording Studios
Progressive rock albums by English artists
Albums produced by Tobias Jesso Jr.